Once is the debut album by American indie rock band The Tyde, released in 2001.

Neal Casal, of Ryan Adams and the Cardinals, lists Once as one of his favourite albums of all time.

Track listing
All songs written by Darren Rademaker.

"All My Bastard Children" – 5:09
"New Confessions" – 3:15
"Strangers Again" – 3:13
"Get Around Too" – 5:18
"North County Times" – 2:26
"The Dawn" – 5:54
"Improper" – 2:45
"Your Tattoos" – 4:17
"Silver's Okay Michelle" – 9:42

References

The Tyde albums
2001 debut albums